Taranjit Singh (born 28 March 1987) is an Indian cricketer. He made his Twenty20 debut for Maharashtra in the 2009–10 Syed Mushtaq Ali Trophy on 20 October 2009.

References

External links
 

1987 births
Living people
Indian cricketers
Maharashtra cricketers
Cricketers from Hyderabad, India